Thyasira is a genus of saltwater clams, marine bivalve mollusks in the family Thyasiridae.

Species
There are more than 50 species in the genus, including both extant (living) and extinct fossil species:

 Thyasira gouldi
 Thyasira scotiana
 Thyasira trisinuata

References 

Thyasiridae
Bivalve genera